In the administrative divisions of Haiti, the department is the first of four levels of government. Haiti is divided administratively into ten departments, which are further subdivided into 42 arrondissements, 145 communes, and 571 communal sections.

In 2014, there was a proposal by the Chamber of Deputies to increase the number of departments from 10 to 14 —perhaps as high as 16.

Administration
Each departement has a departmental council (conseil départemental) compound of three members elected by the departmental assembly for a 4-year term. The departmental council is led by a president (président). The council is the executive organ of the department.
 	
Each department has a departmental assembly who assists the council in its work. The departmental assembly is the deliberative organ of the department. The members of the departmental assembly are also elected for 4 years. The departmental assembly is led by a president.

History
Three Departments have roots in the former French colony of Saint-Domingue, namely: the Nord, Sud, and Ouest. In 1801, under Governor-General Toussaint Louverture, the "provinces," became known as departments. 
The departement of l'Artibonite was known as departement of Louverture.

Under the administration of Dessalines the country was administrated by military divisions.

In 1821, Artibonite was created and in 1844, Nord-Ouest, both derived out of the Nord and Ouest departments. In 1962 during the reign of Duvalier, four new departments were created out of a territorial redistribution. These departments were: Centre, Grand'Anse, Nord-Ouest and Sud-Est. In 2003, a tenth department was created out of Grand'Anse, called Nippes.

Since then, the phrase  was soon adopted to describe the diaspora.

Demographics 
Data based on 2015 estimates from the Haitian government.

See also
ISO 3166-2:HT
Haiti
Arrondissements of Haiti
Communes of Haiti
List of departments of Haiti by Human Development Index
List of Caribbean First-level Subdivisions by Total Area

References

External links
Code Postal Haitien

 
Subdivisions of Haiti
Haiti, Departments
Haiti 1
Departments, Haiti
Haiti geography-related lists